The 2009 Dunlop Townsville 400 was the sixth race meeting of the 2009 V8 Supercar Championship Series. It contained Racess 11 and 12 of the series and was held on the weekend of 11–12 July at Townsville Street Circuit, in Townsville in Queensland, Australia.

New event

The 2009 Townsville 400 is the inaugural running of this race. The first time a major motorsport has been held in North Queensland, the race has been assembled around a specially created street circuit, as no permanent racing facilities exist in north Queensland, apart from clay surface speedway circuits. Apart from Speedway racing, the largest event previously held in this part of Australia have been rounds of the Queensland Rally Championship.

The race will follow V8 Supercar's most familiar street circuit format with two races evenly split over the Saturday and Sunday of the event. Similar to the Hamilton 400 event the races will be 200 kilometres in length, rather than those of the Adelaide 500 which are 250 kilometres long.

The 2.85 kilometre Townsville Street Circuit becomes the sixth race track in Queensland to host a round of the Australian Touring Car Championship (of which the V8 Supercars form a part of its history), following Lowood circuit, Lakeside Raceway, Surfers Paradise Raceway, Queensland Raceway and most recently the Surfers Paradise Street Circuit.

The race also represents an important litmus test for V8 Supercar, as this is the second time they have attempted to grow a street race event in a region where motor racing had not previously had a following, after the failure of the Canberra 400.

Changes

Mark McNally makes his V8 Supercar series debut, replacing Dale Wood in the #16 Kelly Racing Holden Commodore. Wood remains with the team, although it has not yet been confirmed that Wood will form part of the team's endurance racing squad.

Jason Bright debuts his new race car, the first built by his new team. Stone Brothers Racing. The Ford FG Falcon replaces the Ford BF Falcon that Bright brought to the team from his former team, Britek Motorsport. The only drivers left in the series still running the older BF Falcons now are PCR's Michael Patrizi and the car of Marcus Marshall whose proposed sale of the team to Grant Sherrin of Sherrin Motorsport fell through since the previous round of the series at Hidden Valley Raceway.

Results

Race 11

Qualifying

Race 11

Standings
 After round 6 of 14

References

External links
Official event website
Official series website
Official timing and results

Dunlop Townsville 400
July 2009 sports events in Australia